It's Done is the debut studio album by German boy band Overground. It was released on November 17, 2003 by Cheyenne, Polydor and Zeitgeist.

Track listing

Charts

Weekly charts

Year-end charts

Certifications and sales

References

2003 debut albums
Overground (band) albums
Polydor Records albums